José Joaquín Brunner Ried (born 5 December 1944) is a Chilean politician who served as minister.

References

1944 births
Living people
Chilean people of German descent
20th-century Chilean politicians
21st-century Chilean politicians
Pontifical Catholic University of Chile alumni
Leiden University alumni
Christian Democratic Party (Chile) politicians
Popular Unitary Action Movement politicians
Party for Democracy (Chile) politicians
Politicians from Santiago
Chilean Ministers Secretary General of Government